The mangrove golden whistler (Pachycephala melanura) or black-tailed whistler, is a species of bird in the family Pachycephalidae. It is found in mangrove forests and adjacent wet forests of Papua New Guinea and Australia.

Subspecies
Five subspecies are recognized:
 Pachycephala melanura dahli - Reichenow, 1897: Found in the Bismarck Archipelago and south-eastern New Guinea
 Robust whistler (P. m. spinicaudus) - Mathews, 1912: Originally described as a separate species in the genus Pteruthius. Found in southern New Guinea and islands in the Torres Strait
 P. m. violetae - (Pucheran, 1853): Found in northern Australia
 P. m. melanura - Gould, 1843: Found in north-western Australia
 P. m. robusta - Masters, 1876: This subspecies is also called "robust whistler". Found in northern Australia

References

mangrove golden whistler
Birds of the Bismarck Archipelago
Birds of the Northern Territory
Birds of Papua New Guinea
Birds of Queensland
Birds of Western Australia
mangrove golden whistler
Taxonomy articles created by Polbot